Héctor Juliano Maturano Giuranovich (23 July 1921 – 5 October 1986) was an Argentine boxer. He competed in the men's middleweight event at the 1952 Summer Olympics.

References

1921 births
1986 deaths
Argentine male boxers
Olympic boxers of Argentina
Boxers at the 1952 Summer Olympics
Boxers from Buenos Aires
Middleweight boxers